Kaj Sierhuis (born 27 April 1998) is a Dutch professional footballer who plays as a forward for Ligue 1 club Reims.

Club career

Ajax
Sierhuis was born in Athens, Greece, on 27 April 1998, when his father, Cock Sierhuis, was president of AEK Athens. The family returned to the Netherlands when Kaj was four years old, and he grew up in Jisp, North Holland.

He had started playing football with WSV '30 in Wormer in the province of North Holland as a five-year-old before moving the to Ajax Youth Academy at age 11. In August 2016, he signed his first professional contract and made his first appearances for Jong Ajax on 25 November 2016 in an Eerste Divisie match against Telstar. That season he also continued to play for the under-19 team in the league and in the UEFA Youth League. In the 2016–17 season, he was top goalscorer in the UEFA Youth League alongside Jordi Mboula of Barcelona. In the 2017–18 season, Sierhuis, who had outgrown the youth teams, was not always part of the regular lineup, but scored 14 goals in 20 appearances and became second-tier Eerste Divisie champion with Ajax's second team, which could however not win promotion due to Dutch league rules. Sierhuis made his first competitive appearance for the Ajax first team on 25 July 2018 in a 2–0 win in the UEFA Champions League second qualifying round against Sturm Graz.

After making just two appearances in the Eredivisie, Sierhuis agreed to a loan move to Groningen until the end of the season with an option to buy. He quickly earned a starting place as Groningen qualified for play-offs for a place in the UEFA Europa League third qualifying round. There, the Groningen side was eliminated in the first round by Vitesse.

Reims
On 1 February 2020, Sierhuis signed with Ligue 1 club Reims on a long-term contract. He made his debut for the club on 5 February 2020, starting in a league game against Nice, but had to be replaced by Nathanaël Mbuku in the 13th minute after falling out with a hamstring injury. Due to the COVID-19 pandemic, this remained Sierhuis' only appearance for Reims in the 2019–20 season. 

In the 2020–21 season, he made regular appearances for Reims, but his playing time decreased from the beginning of 2021 and he was sent on a one-season loan to Eredivisie club Heracles Almelo in August 2021. After 19 total appearances in which he scored one goal, he tore his anterior cruciate ligament on 11 February 2022 against Utrecht and was sidelined for the rest of the season.

He rejoined the Reims squad for the 2022–23 season.

Honours
Jong Ajax
 Eerste Divisie: 2017–18

References

External links
 
 

Living people
1998 births
Footballers from Athens
Association football forwards
Dutch footballers
Netherlands under-21 international footballers
Netherlands youth international footballers
Dutch expatriate footballers
AFC Ajax players
Jong Ajax players
FC Groningen players
Stade de Reims players
Heracles Almelo players
Eredivisie players
Eerste Divisie players
Ligue 1 players
Championnat National 2 players
Expatriate footballers in France
Dutch expatriate sportspeople in France